Hausham is a municipality in the district of Miesbach in Bavaria in Germany.

Geography

geographical classification
Hausham is located approximately 45 km south of Munich, between Miesbach and Schliersee. It is surrounded to the south by mountains, including Huberspitz (1.052 m) and Neureuth (1.261 m).

Districts
Hausham's 13 districts are:

Twin towns
Since 1959 Levico Terme in Italy
Since 1990 Seiersberg in Austria

History
Hausham was created from the town of Agatharied on 27 April 1922. This was due to Hausham's growth through coal mining.

The first brown coal mine was opened in 1860 but couldn't compete with the cheaper fossil oil and mineral coal and closed 106 years later in 1966.

Transport

Public transport
Hausham is located on a direct railway line to Munich and has two stations: (Hausham and Agatharied). The line is operated by the private railway Bayerische Oberlandbahn.
In addition to rail links, the Hausham area is served by the RVO local bus service.

Famous people in Hausham
Benjamin Lauth, footballer for 1860 München
Marcus H. Rosenmüller, film director
Josef Stallhofer, artist painter
Josef Wurmheller, German fighter ace during WW2

References

External links
official webpage Hausham (German)

Miesbach (district)